Penyrheol, Trecenydd and Energlyn is a community in Caerphilly county borough, part of the town of Caerphilly, South Wales. It includes the areas of Penyrheol, Trecenydd and Energlyn. At the 2011 census the population of the community was 12,537.

References

External links
 Community council website

Communities in Caerphilly County Borough